Moon Lovers: Scarlet Heart Ryeo is a South Korean television series based on the Chinese novel Bu Bu Jing Xin. It aired from August 29 to November 1, 2016, on SBS, every Monday and Tuesday at 22:00 (KST), for 20 episodes.

The series recorded an average nationwide rating of 7.6% for Nielsen Korea and 7.3% for TNMS, and was considered a failure for its performance below expectations. The drama has reportedly been sold for more than $400,000 per episode to the Chinese broadcasting station Youku, totaling over $8 million and thus became the most expensive Korean drama ever sold at the time. The record was beaten a few months later by Man to Man.

Synopsis
During a total solar eclipse, a 25-year-old 21st-century woman, Go Ha-jin (Lee Ji-eun), is transported back in time, to the Goryeo Dynasty.

She wakes up in the year of 941, in the body of Hae Soo, among the many princes of the ruling Wang family, during the reign of King Taejo.

She initially falls in love with the gentle and warm-hearted 8th Prince Wang Wook (Kang Ha-neul), but later develops a relationship with Wang So (Lee Joon-gi), the fearsome 4th Prince, who hides his face behind a mask and is given the derogatory label of "wolf-dog".

As the story develops, Hae Soo finds herself unwittingly caught up in the palace politics and the rivalry among the princes, as they fight for the throne.

Cast

Main
 Lee Joon-gi as 4th Prince Wang So
 Hong Dong-young as young Wang So
Initially known as the cruel and aloof one among the princes, he is both feared and misunderstood by those around him. He begins to change because of Hae Soo, who quickly realizes that his coldness was a front to hide his pain. 
 Lee Ji-eun as Go Ha-jin / Hae Soo
A girl with a painful life, who travels back in time. She is an optimistic girl and can't stand injustice. She becomes the first one to understand Wang So's pain and decides to help him. She cares deeply for her loved ones. She initially develops feelings for the 8th Prince, but later falls for the 4th Prince.
 Kang Ha-neul as 8th Prince Wang Wook
A good man who deeply cares for the people around him. His kind charms make Hae Soo fall for him. However, his position place him as a rival for both of love and throne to Wang So.

Supporting

Princes
 Kim San-ho as Crown Prince Wang Mu
The oldest prince.
 Hong Jong-hyun as 3rd Prince Wang Yo
The clever and ambitious older brother of Wang So who has his eyes on the throne.
 Yoon Sun-woo as 9th Prince Wang Won
A conceited, proud, and narcissistic royal who aids Yo and Wook in their pursuit for the throne.
 Byun Baek-hyun as 10th Prince Wang Eun
A mischievous and playful royal with a lively but annoyingly childish personality who becomes Hae Soo's first friend in Goryeo.  
 Nam Joo-hyuk as 13th Prince Wang Baek-ah
One of Hae Soo's friends and a romantic playboy is known for his refined and aristocratic manners. He is very good-looking and has a deep love for music and arts.
 Ji Soo as 14th Prince Wang Jung
The youngest Prince who has a crush on Hae Soo and befriends her, also stays by her side until she dies. As per her last wish, Wang Jung then raises Hae Soo and Wang So's daughter.

Goryeo Imperial Family
 Jo Min-ki as Wang Geon, King Taejo
Founder of the Goryeo Dynasty.
 Park Ji-young as Queen Yoo
Taejo's 3rd Queen and a mother to Wang Yo, Wang So and Wang Jung.
 Jung Kyung-soon as Queen Hwangbo
Taejo's 4th Queen and mother of Wang Wook and Princess Yeon-hwa. She was accused of causing Court Lady Oh's miscarriage.
 Kang Han-na as Princess Hwangbo Yeon-hwa, later Queen Daemok
Wang Wook's full younger sister and Wang So's future first wife.

Women of the Princes
 Park Si-eun as Lady Hae Myung-hee
Wang Wook's wife and Hae Soo's sixth cousin.
 Jin Ki-joo as Chae-ryung
Hae Soo's servant and friend, who loves the 9th Prince, Wang Won.
 Seohyun as Woo-hee
A gisaeng, who is the last Princess of Later Baekje and Baek-ah's lover.
 Ji Hye-ran as Park Soon-deok
Park Soo-kyung's daughter and Wang Eun's wife.

Others
 Kim Sung-kyun as Choi Ji-mong
The king's astronomer. Crown Prince Wang Mu's friend.
 Sung Dong-il as Grand General Park Soo-kyung
Soon-deok's father and Wang So's right-hand man.
 Woo Hee-jin as Court Lady Oh Soo-yeon
Head of the Damiwon Palace, King Taejo's one true love and Hae Soo's mentor, who is a mother-like figure to her.
 Choi Byung-mo as Park Young-gyu, Wang Yo's father-in-law
 Park Jung-hak as Wang Sik-ryeom, King Taejo's cousin
 Kim Kang-il as a member of the Shinju Kang clan

Special appearances
 Byeon Woo-seok as Go Ha-jin's ex-boyfriend (Ep. 3)
 Jang Hae-min as Go Ha-jin's friend (Ep. 3)
 Park Kwi-soon as the Chief Monk of the temple where the tongueless monks reside (Ep. 3)
 Oh Yoo-mi as court lady (Ep. 10)
 Jang Seo-hee as Lady Gyeonghwa
Crown Prince Wang Mu's daughter who later become Wang So's second wife and consort (Ep. 14)
 Seo Eun-sol as Hae Soo and Wang So's daughter (Ep. 20)
 Kim Do-hye as Bok-soon, Wang Wook's daughter (Ep. 20)

Production

Development
On June 25, 2015, director Kim Kyu-tae and his production company, BaramiBunda Inc., announced that they were in the early stages of making a Korean version of the Chinese novel Bu Bu Jing Xin by Tong Hua.

NBC Universal joined the investors on September 15, covering half of the budget of ₩15 billion and raising the expectations for the drama, which would have been filmed entirely before the broadcast and would be aired simultaneously in China and abroad. On January 25, 2016, YG Entertainment also joined the investors.

The Chinese streaming platform Youku bought Moon Lovers at $400,000 per episode, making it the most expensive Korean drama ever sold, surpassing the records previously set by Descendants of the Sun and Uncontrollably Fond, which were sold to China for $250,000 per episode. The record was beaten a few months later by Man to Man.

Casting and filming 

On November 11, 2015 it was announced that Lee Joon-gi had been offered the male lead part of Wang So. The actor confirmed his participation in the project on January 4, 2016, and the same day it was announced that Lee Ji-eun (IU) had accepted the part of the female lead. The first script reading took place four days later.

Filming, which lasted five months, began in February 2016 at the Yoseonjeong pavilion and the Yoseon-am rocks in Yeongwol County, Gangwon Province, ending in the early hours of July 1, when IU filmed her last scene from episode 20.

Lee Joon-gi ended his part on June 30 on the set in Icheon, Gyeonggi Province.

Other locations include Baekje Cultural Center, Naju Image Theme Park, Ondal Tourist Park in Danyang County, North Chungcheong; Unjusa and Man-yeonsa temples in Hwasun County; Saseong-am Hermitage on Mount Osan in Gurye County; Wolhwawon garden in the Hyowon park in Suwon; Seyeonjeong pavilion on Bogil island, Cheonjuho lake in the Pocheon Art Valley, Miryang lake, Ban-gok lake, Seon-gyojang residence in Gangneung and the hanok complex of the Nampyeong Moon family in Daegu.

The jewels were all created by Jung Jae-in of Minhwi Art Jewelry, and IU herself designed the hairpin with the peony gifted by Wang So to the female lead. Artist Lee Hoo-chang designed and supervised the production of the over one hundred masks for the drama.

Original soundtrack

Charted songs

Broadcast 
On August 27, 2016, two days before the airing of the series, South Korean channel SBS aired a one-hour preview containing a historical introduction presented by History professor Seol Min-seok, behind the scenes and interviews with the actors.

The 20-episode drama officially started from August 29 on Mondays and Tuesdays, simultaneously in China, Hong Kong, Australia, Cambodia, Malaysia, Singapore, Brunei, and Indonesia, exceptionally airing the first two episodes back to back, and ended on November 1, 2016.

A second special episode, containing the historical introduction already presented in the August preview and a summary of the first seven episodes, was broadcast on September 14, for the Chuseok.

On September 3, SBS aired the first three episodes again in the Director's Cut version following the audience's observations on the soundtrack and the presence of too many characters which were considered a source of distraction.

Reception

Commercial performance 
According to the research institute Good Data Corporation, the series was the 3rd most discussed drama of the year, after Descendants of the Sun and Love in the Moonlight.

Moon Lovers: Scarlet Heart Ryeo was chosen as the most anticipated series of the second half of 2016 in China, reaching 300 million views after the first three episodes on the online streaming platform Youku. The series reaching more than a billion views after episode 9, and two billions after episode 18.

According to Kantar Media, in Malaysia and Singapore the ratings were triple compared to those of Love in the Moonlight, with the share surpassing 70% in its time slot, and in Singapore it was number three in 2016 Google Trends (TV shows section).

It topped Taiwan's VOD service website KKTV Drama Chart in the September 19–25 week, and was the top content on Hong Kong VOD service's Laiko since the first week of September.

On DramaFever, which made it available in North and South America, it recorded more than two million views within the mid-series. In an American survey conducted on Korean content consumers in October 2016, Moon Lovers: Scarlet Heart Ryeo and Lee Joon-gi placed second in the drama and favorite actors charts respectively, while Lee Ji-eun placed third in the favorite actresses chart.

The next episode previews released through Naver TV cast, South Korea's largest portal site, reached more than one million views each in early October.

Critical response 
After the premiere, audience reviews were mixed, with the adaptation, the soundtrack, the photography, and Lee Joon-gi's acting being praised, while Byun Baek-hyun's performances received criticism. Lee Ji-eun's performance received mixed reviews: some critics believed the actress was doing a good job "seeing the nature of Moon Lovers, where the mood changes at every scene," while others believed that director Kim Kyu-tae's trademark close-ups revealed her lack of emotion.

While for Kim Yoo-jin of TenAsia the drama's brevity (20 episodes against the 35 of the Chinese version) and the rapid pace weren't sufficient to introduce each character, for MediaUs the first two episodes were interesting because they had made a good connection between characters through rapid development, suggesting however that, if Moon Lovers had focused on the power struggles of the early Goryeo Dynasty "instead of setting up the Goryeo version of Boys Over Flowers," it would have been possible to receive a positive response from male viewers interested in political dramas.

According to Lee Woong of Yonhap News, the first part of the drama highlighted the love triangle of the main characters, while almost all conflicts stemmed from Queen Yoo's pathological love for Wang Yo and her evil acts to make him King, thus making the entire drama too fragile. There were also doubts about the plausibility of the developments, such as the historical knowledge of the female lead, and that Wang So's scar could be covered with makeup.

After the airing of episodes 8 and 9, culture critic Ha Jae-keun said "Moon Lovers has lost viewers because of its characters and situations that are hard to relate to. The lack of empathy made viewers feel less involved and couldn't catch them. If the drama shows clear love lines and power struggles from the leading actors, we can expect a rebound in ratings."

With the 10th episode, the mood of the drama changed with the beginning of the power struggle over the throne among the princes, and the development of a three-dimensionality in characters considered "flat and dull" until that moment: Yonhap News again wrote that "IU has shed her comic acting and grasped Hae Soo's emotions in front of a tragic fate. Wang Wook, who has failed to win love and is anxious to choose power for the survival of his family, has become a tragic but empathetic real person." Lee Seung-rok of MyDaily also noted that after turning to tragedy in the second half, the acting, directing and writing had found stability, contributing to the increase in ratings.

The opinions on the finale were discordant: despite the good acting performances of the actors, viewers complained about the excessive product placement in the last episode. On the drama in general, Lee Woong of Yonhap News expressed a positive opinion, writing that Moon Lovers faithfully portrayed the tragedy of a love, tragic "not because of misunderstanding, jealousy, or selfishness," but because "one day, the ideals it's chasing have to be broken in front of reality. It has produced an irresistible catharsis by compellingly polarizing the tragic contradictions that love actually has. [...] It didn't escape or glorify the tragic reality as any other fantasy did, but rather used fantasy as a dramatic device to show the tragedy of reality. [...] Moon Lovers portrays a love that withered in the face of power. [...] The Goryeo Dynasty visited by Go Ha-jin was a stage for dramatically exposing the same contradictions we experience in ordinary life."

Park Si-eun's and Woo Hee-jin's acting in their last episodes was also praised for its solidity and maturity, and Oh My Star noted that "compared to the beginning, Lee Ji-eun's acting seems to have melted into the drama thanks to Woo Hee-jin's strong support".

The reception abroad and on the Internet was more positive than in South Korea. After five episodes, the People's Daily wrote that "the Chinese version is calm and steady, while the Korean version is more catering to the new generation of online audiences: the overall style is bright, adding a lot of funny elements. The handling of these details reflects South Korea's serious attitude in remaking foreign work."

Awards 
On October 28, 2016 Moon Lovers received the K-Culture Pride Award at Korea Brand Awards "for the contribution to the exchange of cultural contents" between Korea and China, and at the end of the year, it was nominated for twelve prizes at SBS Drama Awards, winning seven in total. Due to Moon Lovers, Lee Joon-gi's popularity grew and the actor's name consistently topped the real-time and weekly portal sites search rankings. In episode 8, his performance in the last scene drew viewers' attention, and his name, the drama title and "Gwangjong" were the most searched words; the actor was later nominated for the Daesang (Grand Prize) at 2016 SBS Drama Awards.

Viewership
According to Nielsen Korea, the first episode recorded a nationwide viewership rating of 7.4%, the second one of 9.3%, while the third came down to 7%, reaching the minimum, 5.7%, with episode 4. The viewership rating started rising with episode 10, went down again on episode 16 with 5.9%, and reached the highest rating with the last episode, which recorded the 11.3%.

With an average nationwide rating of 7.6% for Nielsen Korea and 7.3% for TNMS, the drama was considered a failure for its performance below expectations. What was pointed out as the main cause of low viewership ratings, however, was the pre-production of the drama, which made it impossible to make changes on the way based on feedback, because filming had already ended.

The network tried to remedy the problem by modifying the episodes starting from the sixth, adding new scenes and removing others, thus creating a version of the drama different from the one previously sold abroad.

The fact that the drama wasn't an original story, but a remake, was also indicated as a reason for the disappointing ratings because it created in the potential audience the preconceived idea that the story was heavy and difficult to approach.

For Hankook Ilbo, the audience was tired of bad guys and complicated emotions, preferring instead a kind male lead and a simple story like in Love in the Moonlight, another historical drama of different content aired simultaneously on KBS2. The two series were compared throughout the entire broadcast, during which Moon Lovers was overshadowed by the rival in terms of share, remaining in last place among the dramas broadcast the same evening from the three main television channels, but recording the highest Content Power Index in the second week of September and October. With the end of Love in the Moonlight on October 18, viewership rating started increasing steadily and Moon Lovers was the most watched drama on the evening of October 24.

See also
 Scarlet Heart

Notes

References

External links

  
 

Scarlet Heart
South Korean time travel television series
Alternate history television series
Korean-language television shows
2016 South Korean television series debuts
Television shows based on works by Tong Hua (writer)
Television series set in the 10th century
South Korean historical television series
Seoul Broadcasting System television dramas
Television series set in Goryeo
South Korean fantasy television series
Fiction about body swapping
Television series by Universal Television
Television series by YG Entertainment
South Korean pre-produced television series
2016 South Korean television series endings